Rachel Lichtman (born December 1, 1973) is an American visual artist, comedy writer, and filmmaker, who created the independent, retro-futuristic channel Network 77 in 2017. Network 77 featured a variety of comedy and music programming, and has been described as "funny as classic SCTV and as retro-accurate as Documentary Now!" Lichtman's style is defined by its deeply referenced pop culture humor and vintage design. In 2022, Network 77 evolved into Programme 4, a new audio/visual channel in the aesthetic of broadcast television in the 60s and 70s, premiering in early 2023.

In addition to two “programming blocks” of the Network 77 variety/sketch series, she created two episodes of the scripted comedy audio series Easy AM 66, a satire of a small town “beautiful music”-format radio broadcast. She also produced, directed and edited full length music programs such as Starpop, Musique, and Ted Leo Presents in a vintage Euro-television style.

Her work has featured notable cameos by Nick Offerman, Ted Leo, Jon Langford (The Mekons), Mitch Easter, Robyn Hitchcock, Bill Janovitz (Buffalo Tom), Pat Sansone, Jon Wurster, Joe Pernice, The Sklar Brothers, Joel Murray, and Frank Conniff.

Lichtman has directed music videos for Ted Leo, Juliana Hatfield, Buffalo Tom, Aimee Mann, Michael Penn, Local H, Laura Jane Grace, The Haden Triplets and others.

Lichtman is also the co-writer and director of Yesterday, Today and TAMAR an ongoing NYC cabaret show starring Tammy Faye Starlite as fictional Israeli sensation Tamar, a character Lichtman and Starlite developed through invented European television and commercial appearances.

In 2015, Lichtman and Sarah Thyre created the Something Cool podcast, covering underappreciated female artists and comedians. As an outgrowth of her work on that podcast, she co-produced a tribute concert called Ode to Bobbie Gentry: Celebrating a Living Legend in 2018 with Tara Murtha. She also directed the unreleased documentary The Guys Who Wrote 'Em, a look into Tommy Boyce & Bobby Hart who created the sound of The Monkees. Lichtman did the visual design for The Monkees' tours in 2011 and 2012 after contributing to the liner notes for the Head reissue in 2010.

References

External links
 Personal website
 

Living people
Place of birth missing (living people)
The Monkees
American directors
American music video directors
1973 births